The Biskhali is a river of Bangladesh, a continuation of the Sugandha.

References

Rivers of Bangladesh
Rivers of Barisal Division